Centro Caribe Sports (formerly Central American and Caribbean Sports Organization (CACSO)) is a regional sports federation which oversees the Central American and Caribbean Games. It is also known by its Spanish acronym ODECABE and/or its name in Spanish: Organización Deportiva Centroamericana y del Caribe.

Its member countries come from nations in Central America and the Caribbean region. It is affiliated to PASO, the Pan American Sports Organization.

Members

Full members

Associate members

Non-members

References

Central American and Caribbean Games
Sports governing bodies in North America
Sports governing bodies in South America
Sports organizations established in 1960